José Fernando Santa Robledo (born September 12, 1970) is a retired football defender who played at international level for Colombia. He played two matches at the 1998 FIFA World Cup, and his club at that time was Atlético Nacional. He also appeared at the 1992 Summer Olympics.

Career
Born in Pereira, Risaralda, Santa was the first person Risaralda Department to play in a FIFA World Cup.

Santa made 28 appearances for the Colombia national football team from 1995 to 1998.

References

External links
 
 

1970 births
Living people
Colombian footballers
Footballers from Medellín
Colombia under-20 international footballers
Colombia international footballers
Olympic footballers of Colombia
Footballers at the 1992 Summer Olympics
1998 FIFA World Cup players
1995 Copa América players
1997 Copa América players
Categoría Primera A players
Atlético Nacional footballers
Colombian football managers
Atlético Nacional managers
Association football defenders
Deportivo Pereira managers
Atlético Huila managers
Deportivo Pasto managers